Rimi Baltic is a major retail operator in the Baltic states based in Riga, Latvia. It is a subsidiary of Swedish group ICA. Rimi Baltic operates 291 retail stores in Estonia (88 stores), Latvia (132 stores) and Lithuania (71 stores) and has distribution centres in each country. The stores have different profiles, depending on range of products and size:
 Rimi Hyper – hypermarkets
 Rimi Super – supermarkets
 Rimi Mini – supermarkets / convenience stores
 Rimi Express – convenience stores

The interior design of the smaller Rimi hypermarkets (known as compact hypermarkets) can also be seen in ICA's smaller hypermarkets in Sweden, such as ICA Maxi Västra Hamnen in Malmö and ICA Maxi Enköping.

History and ownership 
Rimi Baltic was created in 2004 when Finnish Kesko and Swedish ICA agreed to merge their operations in the Baltic states in a 50/50 joint venture. Rimi Baltic officially began operations on 1 January 2005.

Kesko previously had 6 City market hypermarkets and 45 Säästumarket discount food stores in Estonia and 5 City markets in Latvia and 19 Supernetto discount outlets in Latvia. ICA previously owned 33 Rimi stores (supermarkets and compact hypermarkets) across Estonia, Latvia, and Lithuania. Following the merger, all the City market stores were progressively converted to Rimi hypermarkets during 2005.

Towards the end of 2006, Kesko decided to pull out of the joint venture and sold all of its shares in Rimi Baltic to ICA. Rimi Baltic became a wholly owned subsidiary of ICA AB from 1 January 2007. Property deals relating to Kesko's ownership of the former Citymarket sites were completed a few days later.

On December 23, 2016, ICA Gruppen concluded an agreement on the purchase of the Lithuanian company UAB Palink for EUR 213 million. Palink managed the second-largest food retail network, IKI in Lithuania. The Lithuanian Competition Council authorized this acquisition in October 2017 on the condition that 17 Rimi and Iki stores in Vilnius, Kaunas, Klaipeda and Panevezys will be sold to third parties. In mid-March 2018, Rimi Lietuva submitted nominations of potential buyers to the Competition Council. The council did not support them on the grounds that these buyers "would not provide stable and at least as effective competition" as the current company until the deal is implemented. In April, the Competition Council announced that the sale of Iki to Rimi was terminated.

Rimi in other countries 

The Rimi name can also be found in Norway where it has been used on ICA's discount food stores there, but is now operating under the name Coop Norway (the Rimi stores are rebranded to Coop Extra). It has previously been used in Sweden by ICA and in Finland by Kesko, although these stores have since been converted to other formats.

See also
 List of shopping malls in Lithuania

References

External links 
 
Official Estonian website
Official Latvian website
Official Lithuanian website
Press Release on merger of ICA and Kesko's operations in the Baltic states
ICA's acquisition of Kesko's stake in the venture

Supermarkets of Estonia
Supermarkets of Latvia
Supermarkets of Lithuania
Companies based in Riga
Retail companies established in 2004
2004 establishments in Latvia
Latvian brands